Shahrud County is a county in Semnan Province in Iran. The capital of the county is Meygan. At the 2010 census, the county's population (including those portions detached in 2011 to form  County) was 8,830, in 598 families; excluding those positions, the population (as of 2006) was 188,183, in 52,613.  The county is subdivided into three districts: the [[Central District (Shahrud County).  The county has six cities: Shahrud.

References

 اطلس گیتاشناسی استان‌های ایران [Atlas Gitashenasi Ostanhai Iran] (Gitashenasi Province Atlas of Iran)

 

 Counties of Semnan Province